The 1946 South Dakota gubernatorial election was held on November 5, 1946. Incumbent Republican Governor Merrell Q. Sharpe ran for re-election to a third term, but was defeated in the Republican primary by Attorney General George T. Mickelson. In the general election, Mickelson faced farmer Richard Haeder, the Democratic nominee. In part because of South Dakota's growing trend toward the Republican Party, and because of the national Republican landslide, Mickelson easily defeated Haeder, winning 67% of the vote to Haeder's 33%.

Democratic primary

Candidates
Richard Haeder, farmer and president of the South Dakota Rural Electrification Association
Edward Prchal, former member of the South Dakota Board of Regents, 1942 Democratic candidate for the U.S. Senate
Jennie M. O'Hern, Democratic National Committeewoman

Results

Republican primary

Candidates
George T. Mickelson, incumbent Attorney General of South Dakota
Merrell Q. Sharpe, incumbent Governor
Millard G. Scott, former State Rural Credit Director, 1942 Republican candidate for Governor

Results

General election

Results

References

Bibliography
 

1946
South Dakota
Gubernatorial
November 1946 events in the United States